Presidential elections are expected to be held in Yemen at an undefined point in the future. President Abdrabbuh Mansur Hadi was elected for a two-year term in 2012, but elections scheduled for 2014 were postponed until 2015. Amidst increasing violence and the Houthi takeover, the elections have yet to be arranged.

References

Yemeni presidential election
Presidential elections in Yemen